Sir Frederick Matthias Kearns, KCB, MC (1921 – 7 August 1983) was an English civil servant.

Educated at Brasenose College, Oxford, he served in the Second World War before entering the civil service. He was secretary to the commission investigating the Crichel Down affair in 1956 and was subsequently the Ministry of Agriculture, Fisheries and Food's regional controller for Newcastle. In 1960, he returned to MAFF and was its Second Permanent Secretary from 1973 to 1978, during which time he was a key member of the UK's delegation during negotiations with the European Community over the UK's adoption of the Common Agriculture Policy. He resigned in 1978 over disagreements between himself and the minister, John Silkin, which The Daily Telegraph explained where over "the much more assertive line towards the EEC" which Silkin and his government pursued. He later worked as a consultant to the National Union of Farmers.

References 

1921 births
1983 deaths
English civil servants
Alumni of Brasenose College, Oxford
Knights Companion of the Order of the Bath